Laurore St. Juste is a Haitian historian who co-authored a book chronicling the Polish Legions' involvement in the Haitian Revolution, entitled Présence Polonoaise en Haiti (1983).

References
 

Living people
20th-century Haitian historians
Year of birth missing (living people)
Place of birth missing (living people)